Sebastián Cocimano (born 19 May 2000) is an Argentine professional footballer who plays as a forward for Güemes, on loan from Gimnasia La Plata.

Club career
On 26 June 2016, Cocimano signed his first professional contract with Gimnasia y Esgrima. Cocimano made his professional debut Gimnasia y Esgrima with in a 1-0 Argentine Primera División loss to on 15 February 2020. In January 2022, Cocimano joined Primera Nacional club Club Almagro on loan for the rest of the year. However, the spell was cut short and on 1 June 2022, Cocimano signed a new loan deal, this time with Güemes until June 2023.

References

External links

2000 births
Living people
Footballers from La Plata
Argentine people of Italian descent
Argentine footballers
Association football forwards
Argentine Primera División players
Primera Nacional players
Club de Gimnasia y Esgrima La Plata footballers
Club Almagro players